Spruce Woods Provincial Park is located in south-central Manitoba, Canada where the Assiniboine River passes through the delta of sediment left by the last glaciation.
An area of open and stabilized sand dunes within the park provides habitat to species of plants and animals not found elsewhere in Manitoba. In descending order of land area contained, the park lies within the Rural Municipalities of South Cypress, Victoria, and North Cypress.

The Government of Manitoba designated the area a provincial park in 1964. The park is considered to be a Class II protected area under the IUCN protected area management categories. In 2020 it was designated a Canadian Dark-Sky Preserve by the Royal Astronomical Society of Canada.

History
Several Manitoba Historical Plaques have been placed within the park:

 to commemorate Assiniboine (Nakota) First Nation's role in Manitoba's heritage.
 to commemorate Norman Criddle's role in Manitoba's heritage.
 to commemorate Fort des Épinettes - Pine Fort's role in Manitoba's heritage.

Amenities
The Carberry Sandhills, or Spirit Sands is one of a very few areas of sand dunes in Canada.  This region is not a true desert, but the remnant of a sandy delta of the Assiniboine River, from a time when it ran into glacial Lake Agassiz.  The sandhills are home to many unique plants and animals; including some cacti and hognose snakes.

There are several hiking trails in the park open to day hikers, and backpackers can take the Newfoundland Trail for an overnight trip into the park. The Trans Canada Trail also passes through the Park.

Newfoundland Trail is a part of the Épinette Creek Trail System located within the park.

Beginning at a parking lot off PTH 5, the trail twists (38 km) through the hills to Jackfish Lake near the Assiniboine River.  The trail is available year-round and is groomed during the Winter for cross-country skiers. Three enclosed shelters are available along the trail, each with bathroom, waterpump, indoor stove, axe and firewood.  Alongside each shelter are picnic tables and space for several tents.  A smaller hut at the trailhead is available but has no water pump.  The trail is clearly marked at junctions and service road crossings to guide hikers.

Many cyclists enjoy riding on the Epinette Trail System each year. There are a series of loops that carve their way through unique terrain.

See also
List of protected areas of Manitoba
Assiniboine River
North West Company

References

External links

Find Your Favorite Park: Spruce Woods Provincial Park
Carberry Desert and Spirit Sands: A Guide to Manitoba’s Unique Sand Dunes

Provincial parks of Manitoba
Hiking trails in Manitoba
Protected areas established in 1961
1961 establishments in Manitoba
Dark-sky preserves in Canada
Protected areas of Manitoba